The Cathedral of Saint Augustine (or St. Augustine's Cathedral) may refer to several different cathedral churches, including:

Cathedral Basilica of St. Augustine in St. Augustine, Florida
Cathedral of San Agustin in Laredo, Texas
St. Augustine Cathedral (Bridgeport, Connecticut)
 Cathedral of St. Augustine (Iba), Roman Catholic Diocese of Iba, Philippines
Cathedral of Saint Augustine (Kalamazoo, Michigan)
Cathedral of Saint Augustine (Tucson), Arizona
Cathedral of Saint Augustine (Yamoussoukro) in Yamoussoukro, Côte d'Ivoire
Saint Augustine Cathedral in Cagayán de Oro

See also
St. Augustine's Church (disambiguation)
St. Augustine Catholic Church (disambiguation)
St. Augustine Catholic Church and Cemetery (disambiguation)
St Augustine's Abbey (disambiguation)